The Liberty Memorial is the symbol of modern Bulgaria and the liberation of Bulgaria. The monument is the heart of the Shipka National Park-Museum and is located on Shipka Peak.

Its outline resembles a medieval Bulgarian fortress and can be seen from dozens of kilometres. It was built with donations from the people from all over Bulgaria and was inaugurated on 26 August 1934. It is 31.5 m tall and 890 steps lead up to it. The powerful bronze lion, symbolizing the coat of arms of Bulgaria – the symbol of the Bulgarian state – guards the entrance to the Memorial. The other three walls of the monument bear the names Shipka,  and Stara Zahora – the battlefields in defense of the Pass. On the ground floor under a marble sarcophagus, rest the remains of Shipka's defenders. 

The sarcophagus stands on four prone stone lions and above it as honour guards stand the statues of a Bulgarian opalchenets (a member of the Bulgarian Volunteer Corps) and a Russian soldier. The other seven floors of the museum display personal effects of the soldiers and volunteers, medals, photos, weapons and documents related to the battles fought over Shipka. One of the exhibits is a copy of the Samara Flag – the first battle flag of the Bulgarian Opalchentsi. The highest platform of the Liberty Memorial affords a beautiful panoramic view of the surroundings. 

The monument  signifies the heroic defense of the pass. The Ottoman unblocking army of Süleyman Hüsnü Pasha failed to come to the rescue and the Siege of Pleven ended in victory. The latter also predetermines the outcome of the Russo-Turkish War (1877–1878). The road to Sofia is open. 

The cornerstone of the monument was laid on 24 August 1922,  the construction was completed in 1930, and the inauguration of the monument took place on 26 August 1934 by Boris III of Bulgaria.

See also
The Volunteers at Shipka

References

See also

 Monument to the Tsar Liberator
 Stanislas Saint Clair
 Treaty of San Stefano
 Death of Boris III

1934 sculptures
Monuments and memorials in Bulgaria
Tourist attractions in Bulgaria
Battle of Shipka Pass